Liyuu (born 9 January 1997) is a Chinese singer and cosplayer who is affiliated with HoriPro International and Lantis. Beginning her activities as a cosplayer before 2016 under the stage name 黎狱 (pronounced same as "Liyuu"), she made her debut as a musician in 2020 with the release of her first single "Magic Words", the title track of which was used as the opening theme of the anime television series Hatena Illusion. Her music has also been featured in I'm Standing on a Million Lives. She is also known for her role as Tang Keke in the mixed-media project Love Live! Superstar!!. She is nicknamed Li-chan by her fellow Liella members.

Biography
Liyuu was born in Shanghai on 9 January 1997. From an early age she developed an interest in anime, particularly after watching series such as Cardcaptor Sakura, Shugo Chara!, and Reborn!. During her junior high school years, she watched the series K-On! and gained an interest in the character Yui Hirasawa. While researching about anime, she discovered the practice of cosplay, which immediately interested her. Upon entering high school, she began engaging in cosplay activities, with Yui as her first character. At first, she experienced difficulties in preparing for cosplay as her school prohibited the use of make-up, leaving her with little experience in applying it to herself. She then began participating in various cosplay events in China, before attending her first overseas event, appearing at Winter Comiket in Tokyo in 2016. Her activities would gain her a following in Japan, eventually leading to her having over 1 million followers on social media.

Liyuu's interest in pursuing a career as a musician began in junior high school. Although she did not originally intended to become a singer, she developed an interest in anime music and would sing such songs in private. In high school, she published a number of songs on the Chinese video sharing website Bilibili. In 2019, she sang the song "Polaris", which was used as an image song for the character Siren in the mobile game Dragalia Lost. She then became affiliated with the talent agency HoriPro International. In 2020, she made her major debut as a singer under Lantis with the release of her first single "Magic Words"; the title song is used as the opening theme of the anime television series Hatena Illusion. Her second single  was released on 25 November 2020; the title song is used as the closing theme of the anime television series I'm Standing on a Million Lives. In December 2020, it was announced that she will be playing the role of Keke Tang in the multimedia project Love Live! Superstar!!. She held her first solo concert in Yokohama on February 11, 2022.

Personal life
Liyuu lives in Shanghai, visiting Japan at least once a month for cosplay and artist activities.

Discography

Studio albums

References

External links
Official website 
HoriPro International profile  

1997 births
Anime musicians
Chinese expatriates in Japan
Chinese women singers
Expatriate television personalities in Japan
Cosplayers
Horipro artists
Lantis (company) artists
Living people
Singers from Shanghai